Johann Bernhard Stephan, Graf Pálffy de Erdőd (20 August 1664 – 24 March 1751) was a Hungarian noble, Imperial Field marshal and Palatine of Hungary. A troop commander at the time of Prince Eugène of Savoy, he distinguished himself in Italy and against the Kuruc invasions, concluded the Peace of Szatmár and fought in the Turkish War most notably at Peterwardein and at Belgrade. In 1703 he became Ban of Croatia and in 1740 placed the Hungarian royal crown on Maria Theresa. János Pálffy was renowned for his strong loyalty to the Habsburgs and his extraordinary bravery in battle.

Life 
He was the third son of Count Miklós IV Pálffy de Erdőd (1619–1679) and Maria Eleonora von Harrach zu Rohrau (1634–1693). Miklós Pálffy was his eldest brother. Like his father and two elder brothers, he pursued a military career and joined the Habsburg Army in 1681.
 
He participated in the Battle of Vienna and Battle of Párkány, where he was taken prisoner by the Turks, but he managed to escape. He distinguished himself in the Battle of Mohács (1687), and became Generaladjutant of Charles V, Duke of Lorraine. At the age of 24 he had already reached the rank of Colonel and commanded his own regiment. With this regiment, he participated in all the great battles of the Great Turkish War.

He killed John Frederick of Württemberg-Stuttgart, son of Eberhard III, Duke of Württemberg in a duel in 15. October 1693. After the duel, Pálffy fled to Poland but his influential family reached the amnesty for him shortly.

In 1695 he was seriously wounded in a battle with the French under Claude de Villars near Mainz. In 1704 he became Ban of Croatia and Cavalry General.

During Rákóczi's War of Independence, he was sent to Hungary as commander of the Cavalry. He participated in a number of minor battles but played a vital role in the victory in the Battle of Trencsén. Pálffy was made Field Marshal and received command of all troops in Upper Hungary.

In this phase he, a Hungarian loyal to the Emperor, negotiated with Francis II Rákóczi, which led to a truce and later the Treaty of Szatmár, after which 12,000 men of Rákóczi's army swore allegiance to the Habsburg dynasty in the fields outside of Majtény in Szatmár.

In the Austro-Turkish War of 1716–18, he participated again in all major actions and was wounded several times.After the war, he resumed his diplomatic activities and persuaded the Hungarian and Croat nobility to accept the Pragmatic Sanction.

In the Austro-Turkish War, 1737–1739, he received command of an army corps of 30,000 men, but saw no action.

After the death of Emperor Charles VI in 1740, he became protector of the young Empress Maria Theresa and her councilor, mainly in Hungarian affairs. He became Knight in the Order of the Golden Fleece and Palatine of Hungary.

Pálffy remained for the rest of his life a confidant of the Empress, who called him affectionately Vater Palffy. He died in 1751.

Personal life 
He married Countess Teréz Czobor de Czoborszentmihály on 4 October 1687, the couple had several children. After the death of his first wife, he married Countess Maria Julia von Stubenberg on 28 August 1741. This marriage was without children.

External links 
Biography (in German)

1664 births
1751 deaths
17th-century Hungarian people
18th-century Hungarian people
Hungarian nobility
Field marshals of Austria
Bans of Croatia
Palatines of Hungary
Judges royal
Burials at St. Martin's Cathedral, Bratislava
Knights of the Golden Fleece of Austria
Austro-Turkish War (1716–1718)
Rákóczi's War of Independence